The Church of Jesus Christ of Latter-day Saints in Bulgaria refers to the Church of Jesus Christ of Latter-day Saints (LDS Church) and its members in Bulgaria. The first convert baptisms were performed in November 1990. In 2021, there were 2,395 members in 7 congregations.

History 

Elder Russell M. Nelson and Elder Hans B. Ringger visited government officials in Sofia in October 1988 and again on February 13, 1990. During the second official Church visit to the country, Elder Nelson asked the government what the Church could do to help the people of Bulgaria. The government indicated that sending English teachers would be most beneficial. That same day in a snow-covered grove, Elder Nelson dedicated Bulgaria for missionary work and provided a blessing of hope for a better day where the nation would develop in peace. On September 12, 1990, six missionaries (2 senior couples and 2 other senior missionaries), under direction of the Austria Vienna East Mission, arrived in Bulgaria to teach English.

The first church service was held October 7, 1990 in one of the missionary couples apartment. Shortly after, the meeting place became a rented hall at Parchevich 49 in Sofia. On November 14, 1990, four proselytizing missionaries arrived and on November 24, the first six converts were baptized. These missionaries did not wear name tags, did not openly proselyte, and worked only through relatives and friends of those they met with. The first branches, Mladost and Sofia Central, were organized on July 1, 1991. The church gained official recognition from the government on July 10, 1991. The first post-communism Bulgarian converts to serve missions were D. Djambov and Lubomir Z. Traykov who began their mission in November 1992. Seminary and institute began in 1994. Excursions to the Freiberg Germany Temple began August 1995 and by October 1996, 138 Bulgarians had received temple ordinances.

Because baptisms were done by relatives of the church, the first four-generation Bulgarian Latter-day Saint member family was established by 1999, less than a decade after the first missionaries arrived in Bulgaria. The first youth conference was held in 1999 in which 106 youth attended. The first Church-built structure in Bulgaria, included a meetinghouse, mission offices, and mission home, was dedicated on June 18, 2000, in Sofia, by Charles Didier of the Seventy. 20 missionaries from Bulgaria were serving missions in 2000. Bulgaria became part of the Europe East Area on September 1, 2000. The mission president and his wife met with Bulgarian Councilor of Religious Affairs on January 30, 2007, to discuss the church in Bulgaria.

Humanitarian Efforts
In 1993, the Church sent many doctors and physicians such as pediatricians, ophthalmologists, audiologists went to Bulgaria to train doctors, nurses and other medical personnel to improve the health care of children. The Church also provided educational training to school administrators. Donations to schools for the mentally handicapped occurred the same year. Church members started a foundation named One Heart, which donated nutritious foods to Bulgarian orphanages in 2003. In 2007, the Church donated equipment to a hospital in Plovdiv used to diagnose brain and cranial conditions. The Church has conducted a total of 310 humanitarian and development projects in Bulgaria since 1985, including seventeen projects in 2017.

Congregations 

As of February 2023, Bulgaria had the following congregations:
Blagoevgrad Branch
Bourgas Branch
Plovdiv Branch
Ruse Branch
Sofia Branch
Stara Zagora Branch
Varna Branch

Congregations not part of a stake are called branches, regardless of size.

Missions
When first missionaries arrived on September 12, 1990, Bulgaria was under the direction of the Austria Vienna East Mission. On July 1, 1991, the Bulgaria Sofia Mission was created with Bulgarian native Kiril P. Kiriakov as president. Kiril Kiriakov, native to Bulgaria, sought political assylem from communist Bulgaria in France and the United States in the 1960s. On July 1, 2015, the Bulgaria Sofia Mission was split, and the Central Eurasian Mission was created from it and the Russia Novosibirsk Missions with its mission office located in Istanbul, Turkey. In April 2018, Bulgaria was added to the mission and it was renamed the Bulgarian Central Eurasian Mission. Its offices were moved to Sofia, Bulgaria. Boundaries for this mission include Azerbaijan, Bulgaria, Tajikistan, Turkey, Turkmenistan, and Uzbekistan.

Temples
There are no temples in Bulgaria. The closest temples to Bulgaria are the Rome Italy Temple and the Kyiv Ukraine Temple. Church President Russell M. Nelson has announced that a temple will be built in Hungary.

See also

Religion in Bulgaria

References

External links
 The Church of Jesus Christ of Latter-day Saints - Bulgaria - Official Site (Bulgarian)
 The Church of Jesus Christ of Latter-day Saints - Bulgaria Newsroom (Bulgarian)
 ComeUntoChrist.org Latter-day Saints Visitor site

 
Christianity in Bulgaria